The Giusti Palace and Garden are located in the east of Verona, Italy, a short distance from Piazza Isolo and near the city centre.  The palace was built in the sixteenth century.  The garden is considered one of the finest examples of an Italian garden.

The palace is a 16th-century Mannerist structure with a tower added in 1701.

The Italian Renaissance gardens were planted in 1580 and are regarded as some of the most beautiful Renaissance gardens in Europe, a splendid park of terraces climbing upon the hill.  They include a parterre and hedge maze, and expansive vistas of the surrounding landscape from the terrace gardens.
First, only two square parterres right and left hand of the cypress way were designed, and a maze behind the right one, as figured in Nürnbergische Hesperides in 1714. Some years later, four additional flower parterres were laid out left hand, as to be seen at a map in the Verona State Archives. The booklet, Il paradiso de' Fiori by Francesco Pona (1622) informs about the plants used in this time in Giardino Giusti as does also some planting sketches by Pona included in the new edition of this book, Milano 2006. The actual unifying layout of the garden parterres dates from early 20th century. The maze was reconstructed after 1945.

The Giusti family, owner of the palace since the 16th century, was entitled by the Austro-Hungarian Emperor to change its original surname to "Giusti del Giardino" because of the importance of the gardens.

In 2020, the garden was hit by a severe storm, causing severe damage to the plants and killing a lot of the trees, including the 600-year old Goethe cypress. The garden has since this incident been added to Europa Nostra's "7 Most Endangered" list of heritage sites at risk.

External links

References
 Francesco Pona: Sileno overo Delle Bellezze del Luogo dell'Ill.mo Sig. Co. Gio. Giacomo Giusti, 1620 Angelo Tamo, Verona
 Francesco Pona: Il Paradiso de' Fiori overo Lo archetipo de' Giardini, 1622 Angelo Tamo, Verona (link pdf)
 Tulio Lenotti: Palazzi di Verona, 1964 Vita veronese, Verona
 Margherita Azzi Visentini: Il Giardino Veneziano: Storia e conservazione, Milano 1988, p. 110-113
 Federico Dal Forno: Case e palazzi di Verona, 1973 Banca popolare di Verona, Verona
 Notiziario BPV: Numero 3, anno 1991.
 Paolo Villa: Giardino Giusti 1993-94 pdf, with maps and 200 photos
 Patrizia Floder Reitter: Case palazzi e ville di Verona e provincia, 1997 I.E.T. edizioni, Verona
 Giorgio Forti: La scena urbana: strade e palazzi di Verona e provincia, 2000 Athesis, Verona
 Mario Luciolli Passeggiando tra i palazzi di Verona 2003 Garda

Giusti
Neoclassical architecture in Verona
Giusti
Giusti
Giardino Giusti